The 2020 Montana Grizzlies football team represented the University of Montana in the 2020–21 NCAA Division I FCS football season. The Grizzlies were led by head coach Bobby Hauck, in the third season of his current stint and the tenth overall season leading the team, as he previously was head coach from 2003 to 2009. They played their home games on campus at Washington–Grizzly Stadium in Missoula, Montana as a charter member of the Big Sky Conference.

Previous season 

The Grizzlies finished the 2019 season 10–4, 6–2 in Big Sky play to finish in a three-way tie for third place. They received an at-large bid to the FCS Playoffs where, after a first round bye, they defeated Southeastern Louisiana in the second round before losing to Weber State in the quarterfinals.

Preseason

Polls
On July 23, 2020, during the virtual Big Sky Kickoff, the Grizzlies were predicted to finish second in the Big Sky by both the coaches and media.

Schedule
Montana  originally had a game scheduled against  (September 5), but it was canceled on July 19 due to the GNAC's decision to cancel fall sports due to the COVID-19 pandemic. The Grizzlies' game against Morehead State (September 19) was canceled on July 27 due to the Pioneer Football League's decision to play a conference-only schedule due to the COVID-19 pandemic.

Montana's April 17 game against Portland State will be counted as a non-conference game, even though both schools compete in the Big Sky Conference.

References

Montana
Montana Grizzlies football seasons
Montana Grizzlies football
College football undefeated seasons